A by-election was held for the New South Wales Legislative Assembly electorate of Upper Hunter on 3 July 1868 due to the resignation of sitting member James White, who left the colony to travel to England, Europe and the United States.

Dates

Results

James White resigned.

See also
Electoral results for the district of Upper Hunter
List of New South Wales state by-elections

Notes

References

1868 elections in Australia
New South Wales state by-elections
1860s in New South Wales